Jarosław Lato (born 17 June 1977 in Świdnica) is a retired Polish footballer (winger). He is not related to Grzegorz Lato.

Career

Club
Lato has also played for Stal Świdnica, Lechia Dzierżoniów, Śląsk Wrocław, RKS Radomsko, Widzew Łódź, Dyskobolia Grodzisk, Polonia Warsaw and Jagiellonia Białystok.

He was released from Jagiellonia Białystok on 24 June 2011.

Successes
 1x Polish Cup Winner (2006/07) with Dyskobolia Grodzisk Wielkopolski.
 2x Ekstraklasa Cup Winner (2007), (2008) with Dyskobolia Grodzisk Wielkopolski.
 1x Polish Cup Winner (2010) with Jagiellonia Białystok.
 1x Polish SuperCup Winner (2010) with Jagiellonia Białystok.

References

External links
 

1977 births
Living people
People from Świdnica
Polish footballers
Dyskobolia Grodzisk Wielkopolski players
Polonia Warsaw players
Śląsk Wrocław players
Widzew Łódź players
RKS Radomsko players
Jagiellonia Białystok players
Association football midfielders
Sportspeople from Lower Silesian Voivodeship